Marianne Majerus, born 1956 in Clervaux, Luxembourg, is one of Europe's leading specialist garden photographers.

Biography
After secondary education in Luxembourg, Majerus took a degree in English at the University of Essex and a degree in Economics at the University of East Anglia. Her first exhibition of landscape photographs was held in 1979 at the Minories Art Gallery in Colchester. Her second, "East Coast", was sponsored by Eastern Arts and toured in 1982.  Her portraits of writers, notably those of Doris Lessing, Malcolm Bradbury and Tom Sharpe, are held in the National Portrait Gallery Collection.

Having illustrated a number of studies of historical culture, as well as food and travel books, Majerus specialised in the photography of plants and gardens. Her company, Marianne Majerus Garden Images, provides garden images to the media in the United Kingdom and worldwide. Majerus is currently a member of the Royal Horticultural Society Photographic Advisory Committee and in 2013 joined The Garden Media Guild's panel of award judges. During the London 2012 Cultural Olympiad Majerus was photographed to represent her native Luxembourg in The World in London exhibition in Victoria Park and on Oxford Street.

Works 
Four portraits by Majerus are exhibited by the National Portrait Gallery (London): of Doris Lessing, Hugo Williams, Malcolm Bradbury and Raffaella Barker. Other works are held by the Arts Council of Great Britain and the Centre National de l'Audiovisuel in Luxembourg. Other portraits include those of J. G. Ballard, Andrew Motion, Tony Harrison and Baroness Ludford.

Her photographs appear regularly in Country Life, The Times, The Sunday Times Magazine, The Daily Telegraph, The Sunday Telegraph Magazine, House & Garden, Homes and Gardens, The Evening Standard (London), The RHS Garden Journal, The English Garden, Gardens Illustrated, as well as many garden magazines in Germany, France, Italy, the Netherlands, Russia, Poland, Slovenia, the United States, Australia and Japan.

Honours, prizes and awards 
In 2018 Majerus took the first prize for the European Garden Photography Award taking in the International Garden Photographer of the Year competition

In 2015 Majerus won the Garden Media Guild Book Photographer of the Year Award for Garden Design: A Book of Ideas (Mitchell Beazley).

In 2014 Majerus won first place in the 'Greening the City' category of the International Garden Photographer of the Year Award 2014

In 2013 Majerus won the Garden Media Guild Features Photographer of the Year Award

In 2012, during the London Cultural Olympiad, a photograph of Marianne Majerus was included in "The World in London" exhibition at Victoria Park and on Oxford Street.

In 2011 Marianne Majerus won the Garden Media Guild Photographer of the Year Award and, earlier in the year, won first place in the 'Garden Views' category of the International Garden Photographer of the Year Award 2011. Majerus also won the 'Luxembourg Book Prize' for her book Die geheimen Gärten Luxemburgs (The Secret Gardens of Luxembourg) in the 'Art and Images' category The same title also made her a finalist in the 2011 Garden Media Guild 'Book Photographer of the Year' category.

In 2010 Marianne Majerus was named 'International Garden Photographer of the Year' for her picture 'Layered landscape: a moment captured'. The same image also won the 'People's Choice Award' as voted for by the public in the 'Garden Views' category.

In 2009 Majerus was a finalist in the Garden Media Guild's 'Photography Portfolio of the Year Award' category

In 2008 Marianne Majerus was awarded second place in the International Garden Photographer of the Year Competition in the "GPA Portfolio Category" and was a finalist in the "Portfolio Category".

She has won first prizes for Image of the Month from the Garden Photographer's Association (part of the Garden Media Guild) for September 2008, December 2008, June 2009, July 2009, August 2009, October 2009, August 2010 and October 2010. 
Second prize in September 2009, July 2010 and September 2010. From January 2011 Marianne Majerus ceased to enter the Image of the Month competitions.

In 2002 she was voted "Photographer of the Year" by the Garden Media Guild (then the Garden Writers' Guild).

In 2000 alongside George Carter(Garden Designer) she won the "Inspirational Book of the Year" award from the Garden Writers' Guild for the book The New London Garden

Books as principal photographer

Books as featured photographer

Exhibitions

Literature 
 Raymond Reuter: 100 Lëtzebuerger ronderëm d'Welt (100 Luxembourgers Around the World), Page. 124: Marianne Majerus, 2003, Éditions Luxnews,

Notes

External links
Marianne Majerus Portfolio
Marianne Majerus Garden Images
Garden Photographer's Association Portfolio
BAPLA Profile
The English Garden Profile
.

1956 births
Living people
Alumni of the University of Essex
Alumni of the University of East Anglia
Photographers from Essex
Luxembourgian emigrants to the United Kingdom
British women photographers
People from Clervaux